Cannabidiol dimethyl ether (CBDD) is a trace component of cannabis which can also be made synthetically. It is a potent and selective inhibitor of the enzyme 15-lipoxygenase and inhibits oxygenation of  linoleic acid, a process involved in the development of atherosclerosis.

See also 
 4'-Fluorocannabidiol
 7-Hydroxycannabidiol
 8,9-Dihydrocannabidiol
 Cannabicitran
 Delta-6-Cannabidiol
 KLS-13019
 O-1918

References 

Cannabinoids
Methoxy compounds